Stone-cum-Ebony is a large mostly rural and marshland civil parish centred  SSW of Ashford in Kent, South East England. It includes the village of Stone in Oxney and tiny community of Ebony.  Its population expanded by 69 in the ten years to 2011.

Geography
The parish is south east of Tenterden, and stands mostly slightly elevated on the eastern side of the Isle of Oxney.

The Saxon Shore Way, a long-distance walking route tracing the old Saxon shoreline, passes through the parish.  Wholly within the greater Isle of Oxney, the far north of the parish is marked by a small tributary of the Rother.  It has one long street lined community at its centre.

History
Being almost flat and rectangular in area, the current bounds are those reflecting the centuries-old church parish boundaries: the south-east of the parish has the Royal Military Canal which helps to drain what was otherwise an almost impenetrable marsh, and the west of the parish reaches to include about a quarter of Wittersham village centre. Its Baptist chapel in the north of the street is now a cottage. The remaining religious building is a Grade II* church, i.e. mid-ranked in the national listed building ranking system. 10 other buildings, nearly half of those in total, are listed on the main street.

Notable residents (past & present)
George Digweed MBE, 16× World Sporting Shooter Champion
Lord Clarke of Stone-cum-Ebony JJSC, Supreme Court Justice
Norman Forbes-Robertson, distinguished Victorian Shakespearean actor
Dave McKean, illustrator, photographer, comic book artist, graphic designer, filmmaker and musician
George Newson, composer
Sinden family:
Sir Donald Sinden CBE, actor
Marc Sinden, film director, actor and West End theatre producer

References

External links
Statistical civil parish overview – map

Civil parishes in Ashford, Kent